École Polyvalente Thomas-Albert (French for Thomas Albert High School) is a Francophone public secondary school in Francophone Nord-Ouest of New Brunswick. It is located in the town of Grand Falls in Victoria County.

See also
List of schools in New Brunswick
Grand Falls, New Brunswick
Madawaska County, New Brunswick

Grand Falls, New Brunswick
High schools in New Brunswick
Schools in Madawaska County, New Brunswick
Educational institutions established in 1969
1969 establishments in New Brunswick